is a Japanese anime television series produced by Silver Link. The series aired from April 12 to June 28, 2018. A manga adaptation began serialization on the Comic Newtype website in January 2018.

Characters
Koma Jinguji (神宮司 高馬, Jingūji Kouma)

Tenna Kisaragi (如月 天奈, Kisaragi Ten'na)

Tsubasa Hayakawa (羽早川 翔, Hayakawa Tsubasa)

Akira Tachibana (橘 晃, Tachibana Akira)

Hotaru Aoba (青葉 蛍, Aoba Hotaru)

Haruto Hizakura (緋櫻 春人, Hizakura Haruto)

Kyoichi Sano (茶野 京一, Sano Kyōichi)

Daichi Kurosawa (黒澤 大地, Kurosawa Daichi)

Takashi Mikuni (御国 鷹司, Mikuni Takashi)

Yuki Fujishiro (藤代 悠希, Fujishiro Yūki)

Hikari Kageyama (影山 輝, Kageyama Hikari)

Ren Shiratori (白鳥 蓮, Shiratori Ren)

Media

Anime
The anime series is directed by Ken Takahashi at Silver Link and written by Megumi Shimizu, with music produced by Lantis. The series was originally scheduled to premiere in January 2018, but was delayed to an April 12, 2018 premiere due to "various circumstances". The series ran for 12 episodes. Crunchyroll streamed the series.

Manga
A manga adaptation illustrated by Yukari Tōdō began serialization on Kadokawa's Comic Newtype magazine on January 23, 2018.

Notes

References

External links
 

Action anime and manga
Anime with original screenplays
Comedy anime and manga
School life in anime and manga
Silver Link
Tokyo MX original programming